USS Barnes may refer to the following ships of the United States Navy:

 , an escort carrier transferred to the Royal Navy in 1942
 , an escort carrier

See also

United States Navy ship names